Goose Creek Energy Center is a 684 megawatt natural gas fired power station located in Goose Creek township, Piatt County, Illinois between Lodge, Illinois and De Land, Illinois. Previously owned by Aquila Piatt County Power, purchased by AmerenUE in 2006.

External links
Ameren Corporate Factsheet 
CAAPP Permit

Energy infrastructure completed in 2002
Buildings and structures in Piatt County, Illinois
Natural gas-fired power stations in Illinois
Oil-fired power stations in Illinois
2002 establishments in Illinois